In the Catholic Church, holy days of obligation are days on which the faithful are expected to attend Mass, and engage in rest from work and recreation (i.e., they are to refrain from engaging in work or activities that hinder the worship owed to God), according to the third Commandment.

The expectation is attached to the holy day, even if transferred to another date, as sometimes happens in the Roman Rite. However, in some countries a dispensation is granted in such circumstances.

Latin Church
The holy days of obligation for Latin Church Catholics are indicated in canon 1246 of the 1983 Code of Canon Law:

Placed in the order of the liturgical calendar, the ten days (apart from Sundays) that this canon mentions are:
8 December: Solemnity of the Immaculate Conception of the Blessed Virgin Mary
25 December: Solemnity of the Nativity of the Lord (Christmas)
1 January: Solemnity of Mary, the Holy Mother of God
6 January: Solemnity of the Epiphany of the Lord
19 March: Solemnity of Saint Joseph, Spouse of the Blessed Virgin Mary
Thursday of the sixth week of Eastertide: Solemnity of the Ascension of the Lord
Thursday after Trinity Sunday: Solemnity of the Most Holy Body and Blood of Christ (Feast of Corpus Christi)
29 June: Solemnity of Saints Peter and Paul, Apostles
15 August: Solemnity of the Assumption of the Blessed Virgin Mary
1 November: Solemnity of All Saints

The number of holy days of obligation was once much greater. With the motu proprio of 2 July 1911, Supremi disciplinae, Pope Pius X reduced the number of such non-Sunday holy days from 36 to 8: the above 10 dates (1 January was then the Feast of the Circumcision of Christ) minus the feasts the Body and Blood of Christ, and Saint Joseph. The present list was established in canon 1247 of the 1917 Code of Canon Law, now canon 1246 of the current Code of Canon Law.

Even before the time of Pius X, the bishops in many countries had obtained the Holy See's approval to diminish the number of non-Sunday holy days of obligation, making it less than 36. Today too, episcopal conferences have availed themselves of the authority granted them to reduce the number below the ten mentioned above.

Non-Sunday holy days of obligation all have the rank of solemnity. Accordingly, if in Ordinary Time one of them falls on a Sunday, the Sunday celebration gives way to it; but the Sundays of Advent, Lent and Eastertide take precedence over all solemnities, which are then transferred to another day (but the precept is not). Occasionally, the Feast of the Sacred Heart may fall on Ss. Peter and Paul's feast day, in which case it takes precedence over the Solemnity of Ss. Peter and Paul; the precept then applies to the feast of the Sacred Heart.

Working holy days
While episcopal conferences may suppress holy days of obligation or transfer them to Sunday, some of them have maintained as holy days of obligation some days that are not public holidays. For most people, such days are normal working days, and they therefore cannot observe the obligation "to abstain from those works and affairs which hinder the worship to be rendered to God, the joy proper to the Lord's day, or the suitable relaxation of mind and body". However, the faithful remain bound by the obligation to participate in Mass. For these days, referred to as "working holy days", churches may have a special timetable, with Mass available outside the normal working hours and on the previous evening. In times past, Holy Days would often be referred to as days of single or double precept, with those of double precept requiring both hearing Mass and abstaining from servile works, whereas days of single precept would permit servile work.

In Ireland the only holy days of obligation that are also public holidays are Christmas and Saint Patrick's Day, so that it has five working holy days. Similarly, Slovakia has only four holy days of obligation that are also public holidays: Christmas, Solemnity of Mary Mother of God, Epiphany, and All Saints', leaving it with five working holy days. In the Netherlands, the bishops conference decreed that, with effect from 1 January 1991, the feasts of the Assumption and All Saints, each of which it had previously decided to celebrate on the following Sunday, were to be of obligation as regards Mass, but not for abstaining from work.

Observance by country
In Vatican City, but not in the rest of the Diocese of Rome, Sundays and all 10 days listed in canon 1246 are observed as holy days of obligation. This is also the case in the Diocese of Lugano (covering the Swiss canton of Ticino), but perhaps nowhere else.

Some countries have as holy days of obligation feasts that are not among those listed in canon 1246. Ireland has Saint Patrick's Day. Germany and Hungary have Saint Stephen on the "Second Christmas Day" (26 December), Easter Monday, and Pentecost Monday (Whit Monday).

In countries where they are not holy days of obligation, three of the ten feast days listed above are assigned to a Sunday as their proper day:
The Feast of the Epiphany to the Sunday that falls between 2 and 8 January; if January 6 falls on Sunday there is no B date,
The Feast of the Ascension of Our Lord, which always falls on a Thursday, to the following Sunday;
The Solemnity of the Most Holy Body and Blood of Christ to the following Sunday.
If they are thus assigned to a Sunday, they are not included in the following national lists of holy days of obligation, since "in every country all Sundays are holy days of obligation".

Argentina
Solemnity of Mary, Mother of God
Assumption of the Virgin Mary
Immaculate Conception of the Virgin Mary
Christmas

Australia
Assumption of the Blessed Virgin Mary
Christmas

Austria
Solemnity of Mary, Mother of God
Epiphany
Feast of the Ascension
The Body and Blood of Christ
Assumption of the Blessed Virgin Mary
All Saints' Day
Feast of the Immaculate Conception
Christmas

Bahrain
Solemnity of Mary, Mother of God
St Thomas
Assumption of the Blessed Virgin Mary
Birth of our Lady
Christmas

Belgium
Feast of the Ascension
Assumption of the Blessed Virgin Mary
All Saints' Day
Christmas

No formal legislative norm of the Episcopal Conference of Belgium exists in which the holy days of obligation are listed. However, the four days mentioned above have been Belgium's holy days of obligation since the concordat of 1801 (which itself is not recognized as legally binding in Belgium since independence). Therefore, the current system is in force because of canon 5 of the 1983 Code of Canon Law.

Brazil
Solemnity of Mary, Mother of God
The Body and Blood of Christ
Immaculate Conception of the Virgin Mary
Christmas

Brunei
Feast of the Ascension
Assumption of the Blessed Virgin Mary
All Saints' Day
Christmas

Canada
Solemnity of Mary, Mother of God
Christmas

Chile
 Assumption of the Virgin Mary
 All Saint's Day
 Immaculate Conception of the Virgin Mary
 Christmas

China
In Mainland China, there are two holy days of obligation according to the Chinese Patriotic Catholic Association: Christmas and Assumption of the Blessed Virgin Mary. However, since the CPCA is not recognized by the Holy See, it is not clear if a Holy See-approved regulation exists. If not, it is likely that the 10 holy days of obligation would apply in Mainland China.

However, this situation only exists in Mainland China. In the Diocese of Hong Kong, Christmas is the only holy day of obligation. The same seems to be true for Taiwan. In the diocese of Macau, the holy days of obligations are the Immaculate Conception of the Blessed Virgin Mary, Christmas, and the Solemnity of Mary, Mother of God.

Colombia
Solemnity of Mary, Mother of God
Immaculate Conception of the Virgin Mary
Christmas

Croatia
Epiphany
Feast of Corpus Christi
Assumption of the Blessed Virgin Mary
All Saints' Day
Christmas

Czech Republic
Solemnity of Mary, Mother of God
Christmas

In Czech Republic, holy days of obligation are, by Czech Bishops' Conference, reduced to only two days, which are also public holidays in the Czech Republic'  Since the other holy days of obligation mentioned in the Code of Canon Law are not public holidays, the Czech Bishops' Conference does not make attendance at Mass obligatory for Catholics, but only recommends it, as it does also on the feast days of Saints Cyril and Methodius (5 July) and Saint Wenceslas (28 September). Attendance at Mass is of course obligatory on all Sundays.

Denmark
Includes Faroe Islands and Greenland.
Feast of the Ascension
Christmas

Dominican Republic
Solemnity of Mary, Mother of God
Epiphany
Feast of Corpus Christi
Christmas
Feast of Our Lady of Altagracia
Feast of Our Lady of Mercy

El Salvador
Solemnity of Mary, Mother of God
Epiphany
Feast of Corpus Christi
Christmas

England and Wales
Epiphany
Ascension
Feast of Saints Peter and Paul
Assumption of the Blessed Virgin Mary
All Saints' Day
Christmas
(See Liturgy Office.)

According to a 1984 decision of the Catholic Bishops' Conference of England and Wales, holydays which fall on a Saturday or a Monday (with the exception of Christmas) are transferred to the adjacent Sunday. In 2006, the Epiphany, Ascension and Corpus Christi were transferred to the nearest Sunday. On 17 November 2016 meeting in Leeds, the Bishops' Conference determined that the Epiphany and the Ascension should be celebrated on their official days, or on the adjacent Sunday when 6 January is a Saturday or a Monday. This decision was approved by the Congregation for Divine Worship and the Discipline of the Sacraments and became effective from 3 December 2017.

There are different regulations for Scotland and for Ireland.

Finland
Solemnity of Mary, Mother of God
Epiphany
Feast of the Ascension
Christmas
(See Catholic Church in Finland: Practical Matters.)

France
Feast of the Ascension
Assumption of the Blessed Virgin Mary
All Saints' Day
Christmas

Germany
Solemnity of Mary, Mother of God
Feast of the Ascension
Christmas
Easter Monday
Pentecost Monday
Saint Stephen's Day or (Second Christmas Day)

In addition, some federal states with a high percentage of Catholic people have one or more of the following holy days of obligation:
Epiphany
Solemnity of the Most Holy Body and Blood of Christ
Assumption of the Blessed Virgin Mary (observed only in some regions of Bavaria as a holy day of obligation)
All Saints' Day

The solemnities of Saint Joseph, Saints Peter and Paul and the Immaculate Conception of Mary are observed nowhere in Germany as holy days of obligation – these days are also not usually transferred to a Sunday (though for Sts. Peter and Paul, this is theoretically possible). Attendance at the liturgical service on Good Friday, a public holiday, is also generally observed, although it is not a holy day of obligation. (see Feiertagsregelung)

Greece
Solemnity of Mary, Mother of God
Epiphany
Assumption of the Blessed Virgin Mary
Christmas

Instead of being transferred to the following Sunday, the Feast of the Ascension of Our Lord, though not a holy day of obligation in Greece, is kept on the Thursday of the sixth week of Easter, in order to celebrate it on the same day as the Orthodox Church of Greece.

Haiti
 Epiphany
 All Saints Day
 Christmas

Hungary

Solemnity of Mary, Mother of God
Epiphany
Assumption of the Blessed Virgin Mary
All Saints' Day
Christmas

Iceland
Solemnity of Mary, Mother of God
Feast of the Ascension
All Saints' Day
Christmas

India
Assumption of Mary
Christmas
Feast of St.Thomas (Dhukrana or St.Thomas day)

Indonesia
 Solemnity of Mary, Mother of God
 Epiphany move to the nearest Sunday between 2–8 January
 Saint Joseph's Day although not a public holiday
 Good Friday
 Feast of the Ascension
 Corpus Christi moved to the Sunday after Trinity Sunday
 Feast of Saints Peter and Paul although not a public holiday
 Assumption of the Blessed Virgin Mary used to be a public holiday but not longer, so moved to the Sunday between 12–18 August
 All Saints Day although not a public holiday 
 Feast of the Immaculate Conception although not a public holiday
 Christmas
Bishops' Conference of Indonesia has not issued regulation about holy day of obligation, so ten holy days on Can. 1246 § 1 applied.

Ireland
includes the entire island of Ireland, i.e. both the Republic of Ireland and Northern Ireland.
Epiphany
Assumption of the Blessed Virgin Mary
All Saints' Day
Immaculate Conception of the Virgin Mary
Christmas
St. Patrick's Day
(See "Working holy days", above)

Italy
Solemnity of Mary, Mother of God
Epiphany
Assumption of the Blessed Virgin Mary
All Saints' Day
Immaculate Conception of the Virgin Mary
Christmas

Japan
Solemnity of Mary, Mother of God
Assumption of the Blessed Virgin Mary
Christmas

Kenya
Solemnity of Mary, Mother of God
Assumption of the Blessed Virgin Mary
All Saints Day
Christmas

Korea
includes the entire Korean Peninsula, including both North and South Korea.
Solemnity of Mary, Mother of God
Assumption of the Blessed Virgin Mary
Christmas

Kuwait
Solemnity of Mary, Mother of God
St Thomas
Assumption of the Blessed Virgin Mary
Birth of our Lady
Christmas

Lebanon
 Epiphany
 Feast of the Ascension
 Assumption of the Blessed Virgin Mary
 All Saints Day
 Immaculate Conception of Blessed Virgin Mary
 Christmas

Luxembourg
Feast of the Ascension
Assumption of the Blessed Virgin Mary
All Saints' Day
Christmas

Malta
Solemnity of Mary, Mother of God
Saint Joseph's Day
Feast of Saints Peter and Paul
Assumption of the Blessed Virgin Mary
All Saints' Day
Immaculate Conception of Virgin Mary
Christmas
The Shipwreck of Saint Paul in Malta on 10 February

Malaysia
Feast of the Ascension
Assumption of the Blessed Virgin Mary
All Saints' Day
Christmas

Mexico
Solemnity of Mary, Mother of God
The Body and Blood of Christ
Christmas
Our Lady of Guadalupe

Moldova
 Epiphany
 Christmas Day
 St. Stephen's Day

Netherlands
Solemnity of Mary, Mother of God
Feast of the Ascension
Assumption of the Blessed Virgin Mary
All Saints' Day
Christmas
(See "Working holy days", above)

New Zealand
Assumption of the Blessed Virgin Mary
Christmas

Nicaragua
Solemnity of Mary, Mother of God
The Body and Blood of Christ
Immaculate Conception of the Virgin Mary
Christmas

Norway
Feast of the Ascension
Christmas Day

Palestine
 Epiphany
 Assumption of the Virgin Mary
 Inmaculate Conception of the Virgin Mary
 Christmas

Panama
Solemnity of Mary, Mother of God
Immaculate Conception of the Virgin Mary
Christmas

Paraguay
Solemnity of Mary, Mother of God
Assumption of the Blessed Virgin Mary
Immaculate Conception of the Virgin Mary
Christmas

Peru
Feast of Saints Peter and Paul
The Feast of St. Rose of Lima
All Saints' Day
Immaculate Conception of the Virgin Mary
Christmas

Philippines
Solemnity of Mary, Mother of God
Solemnity of the Immaculate Conception
Christmas

Poland
Solemnity of Mary, Mother of God
Epiphany
The Body and Blood of Christ
Assumption of the Blessed Virgin Mary
All Saints' Day
Christmas

Portugal
Solemnity of Mary, Mother of God
The Body and Blood of Christ
Assumption of the Blessed Virgin Mary
All Saints' Day
Immaculate Conception of the Virgin Mary
Christmas

Qatar
Solemnity of Mary, Mother of God
Thomas the Apostle
Assumption of the Blessed Virgin Mary
Birth of our Lady
Christmas

Saudi Arabia
Solemnity of Mary, Mother of God
Assumption of the Blessed Virgin Mary
Christmas

Serbia
Epiphany
Christmas

Scotland
Feast of the Ascension
Feast of Saints Peter and Paul
Assumption of the Blessed Virgin Mary
All Saints' Day
Christmas

According to the Bishops' Conference of Scotland in 1986, holy days which fall on a Saturday or Monday (with the exception of Christmas) are transferred to the adjacent Sunday. There are separate regulations for Ireland and for England and Wales.

Singapore

Feast of the Ascension
Assumption of the Blessed Virgin Mary
All Saints' Day
Christmas

Slovakia
Solemnity of Mary, Mother of God
Epiphany
Feast of the Ascension
The Body and Blood of Christ
Feast of Saints Peter and Paul
Assumption of the Blessed Virgin Mary
All Saints' Day
Immaculate Conception of the Virgin Mary
Christmas

All the holy days of obligation listed in the Code of Canon Law except the Solemnity of Saint Joseph are maintained in Slovakia, although only Solemnity of Mary, Epiphany, All Saints' Day and Christmas are also public holidays. See "Working holy days", above.

Additionally, the Slovak Bishops' Conference recommends Mass attendance on the following solemnities, because of their national importance:
Saints Cyril and Methodius (celebrated on 5 July in Slovakia - public holiday)
Our Lady of Sorrows - Patroness of Slovakia (15 September - public holiday)

South Africa
Feast of the Ascension
Assumption of the Blessed Virgin Mary
Christmas

Spain
Solemnity of Mary, Mother of God
Epiphany
Saint Joseph's Day
Assumption of the Virgin Mary
All Saints' Day
Immaculate Conception of the Virgin Mary
Christmas

The following is also a holy day of obligation throughout Spain:
Saint James's Day (Patron of Spain)

Sri Lanka
Solemnity of Mary, Mother of God
Assumption of the Blessed Virgin Mary
Immaculate Conception of the Virgin Mary
Christmas

Sweden

Solemnity of Mary, Mother of God
Epiphany
Feast of the Ascension
Feast of Saints Peter and Paul
Assumption of the Blessed Virgin Mary
All Saints' Day
Christmas

Switzerland
Solemnity of Mary, Mother of God
Epiphany
Feast of the Ascension
The Body and Blood of Christ
Assumption of the Blessed Virgin Mary
All Saints' Day
Christmas
The following days are also holy days of obligation in Switzerland:
Easter Monday
Pentecost Monday
St. Stephen's Day (Second Christmas Day)

In the Diocese of Lugano (covering the canton of Ticino), the following three days are also holy days of obligation:

Saint Joseph's Day
Feast of Saints Peter and Paul
Immaculate Conception of the Virgin Mary

This probably makes the diocese of Lugano the only diocese in the world (except for the Vatican City part of the Diocese of Rome) where all ten holy days of obligation are observed.

Trinidad and Tobago
Solemnity of Mary, Mother of God
Feast of Corpus Christi
Christmas
(See Archdiocesan Office.)

Turkey
Solemnity of Mary, Mother of God
Epiphany
Assumption of the Blessed Virgin Mary
Christmas

Ukraine
Epiphany
Presentation of the Lord
Annunciation of the Holy Virgin Mary
Feast of the Ascension
Transfiguration of the Lord
Assumption of the Blessed Virgin Mary
Nativity of the Blessed Virgin Mary
Exaltation of the Holy Cross
Presentation of Mary
Christmas

These regulations also apply on the Crimean peninsula, including Sevastopol,

United States 
 Solemnity of Mary, Mother of God
 Ascension of the Lord
 Assumption of the Virgin Mary
 All Saints' Day 
 Immaculate Conception of the Virgin Mary
 Christmas

In most of the United States, the Ascension is transferred to the following Sunday (which would otherwise be the Seventh Sunday of Easter). It is only celebrated as a holy day of obligation on Thursday in the ecclesiastical provinces of Boston, Hartford, New York, Omaha, and Philadelphia, as well as by members of the Personal Ordinariate of the Chair of Saint Peter.

According to a complementary norm issued by the USCCB, "Whenever January 1, the solemnity of Mary, Mother of God, or August 15, the solemnity of the Assumption, or November 1, the solemnity of All Saints, falls on a Saturday or on a Monday, the precept to attend Mass is abrogated."

In years when December 8 falls on Sunday, the Solemnity of the Immaculate Conception is normally transferred to December 9, as it is outranked by the Second Sunday of Advent. In this case, the precept to attend Mass, however, is abrogated by the transfer. Under the 1960 Code of Rubrics, still observed by some in accordance with Summorum Pontificum, the feast of the Immaculate Conception has precedence even over an Advent Sunday and is not transferred.

In Hawaii, the Feast of the Immaculate Conception and Christmas are the only Holy Days of Obligation, as decreed by the Bishop of Honolulu in 1992, pursuant to an indult from the Holy See and as approved by the national episcopal conference.

Uruguay 
 Epiphany
 Immaculate Conception of the Virgin Mary
 Christmas

Venezuela
Solemnity of Mary, Mother of God
Christmas

Vietnam
The Ecclesiastical Province of Hanoi observes the following four holy days of obligation, known as the "Four Seasons":

 Christmas
 Feast of the Ascension
 Assumption of Mary into Heaven
 All Saints' Day

Individual dioceses may observe additional holy days of obligation on an ad hoc basis.

Eastern Catholic Churches
The Code of Canons of the Eastern Churches (CCEO) lays down the relevant norms regarding holy days of obligations for Eastern Catholic Churches. There are five holy days of obligation, beyond Sundays, specified as common to all of the Eastern Churches:

The Solemnity of the Nativity of the Lord (Christmas)
The Epiphany
The Ascension
The Holy Apostles Peter and Paul
The Dormition of Holy Mary, the Mother of God

The CCEO provides that only the "supreme authority" of the Church can "establish, transfer or suppress feast days and days of penance which are common to all of the Eastern Churches," although the particular law of a sui juris Church can suppress one of these days or transfer it to Sunday, provided that said particular law has been approved by the Apostolic See. The authority competent to establish the particular law of a sui iuris Church may constitute, transfer, or suppress other feast days and days of penance (i.e., ones that are not common to all the Eastern Churches), under certain conditions.

The faithful of the Eastern Catholic Churches "are bound by the obligation to participate on Sundays and feast days in the Divine Liturgy or, according to the prescriptions or legitimate customs of their own Church sui iuris, in the celebration of the divine praises."

See also

Principal Feast
Principal Holy Day
Moveable feast
Ash Wednesday
Lord's Day

References

External links

Catholic holy days
Christian terminology
Catholic liturgical law
Mass in the Catholic Church
Catholic Church legal terminology
Sacred places and times in Catholic canon law